Vilémovice may refer to:

 Vilémovice (Havlíčkův Brod District), a village in the Czech Republic
 Vilémovice (Blansko District), a village in the Czech Republic